The 1950 Washington State Cougars football team was an American football team that represented Washington State College during the 1950 college football season. First-year head coach Forest Evashevski led the team to a 2–3–2 mark in the Pacific Coast Conference (PCC) and 4–3–2 overall. 

The rivalry game with Washington (now the Apple Cup) marked the first use of Memorial Stadium in Spokane for select Cougar home games, which continued through 1983.

Hired in late January, 32-year-old Evashevski was the backfield coach at Michigan State under Biggie Munn and a former back and team captain at Michigan under Fritz Crisler.

Schedule

References

External links
 Game program: USC at WSC – October 7, 1950
 Game program: Idaho at WSC – October 28, 1950
 Game program: Oregon State at WSC – November 18, 1950
 Game program: Washington vs. WSC at Spokane – November 25, 1952

Washington State
Washington State Cougars football seasons
Washington State Cougars football